Sayaboury Airport  is an airport in Sainyabuli, the capital of Sainyabuli Province of Laos.

It is the closest airport to Wattay International Airport in the Laotian capital of Vientiane.

Airlines and destinations
 there are no scheduled flights in or out of this airport.

External links

Airports in Laos
Buildings and structures in Sainyabuli province